Jean-Marc Nesme (born March 23, 1943) is a member of the National Assembly of France.  He represents the Saône-et-Loire department,  and is a member of the Union for a Popular Movement.

References

1943 births
Living people
Union for a Popular Movement politicians
Deputies of the 12th National Assembly of the French Fifth Republic
Deputies of the 13th National Assembly of the French Fifth Republic